is a Japanese racing driver. Sakurai raced under Filipino license in Formula BMW Pacific and in the GP3 Series.

Career

Karting
Sakurai began his racing career in karting at the age of nine and raced in Japan and Australia.

Formula BMW Pacific
In 2010, Sakurai graduated to single–seaters into the Formula BMW Pacific series in Asia, joining Eurasia Motorsport and racing under a Filipino racing licence. He scored a podium in the second race of the opening round at Sepang and achieved seven more point-scoring finishes on his way to eighth in the championship.

Toyota Racing Series
Sakurai participated in the Toyota Racing Series in early 2011 with M2 Competition, finishing fourteenth in the championship, the lowest-placed of the International Trophy drivers to contest the series.

Formula Three
In 2011, Sakurai decided to race in Europe, taking part in the rebranded Rookie Class of the British Formula 3 Championship with Hitech Racing.  Bart Hylkema was his only class rival in the first half of the championship, before he graduated to the International Class, allowing Sakurai to take the championship title. During the season he also appeared in the Brands Hatch round of the European F3 Open Championship.

GP3 Series
Sakurai raced in the GP3 Series in 2012 with Status Grand Prix.

Racing record

Career summary

Complete GP3 Series results
(key) (Races in bold indicate pole position) (Races in italics indicate fastest lap)

References

External links
 
 

1994 births
Living people
People from Tokyo
Japanese racing drivers
Formula BMW Pacific drivers
Toyota Racing Series drivers
British Formula Three Championship drivers
Euroformula Open Championship drivers
GP3 Series drivers
Auto GP drivers
MRF Challenge Formula 2000 Championship drivers
Hitech Grand Prix drivers
M2 Competition drivers
Team West-Tec drivers
Status Grand Prix drivers
Euronova Racing drivers
Eurasia Motorsport drivers
Japanese F4 Championship drivers